Jesse Leonard Spring (March 18, 1899 – March 25, 1942) was an American-born Canadian professional athlete best known for playing six seasons in the National Hockey League (NHL); he also played several seasons in minor league baseball. He later was a coach in both sports.

Biography
Spring was born in Alba, Pennsylvania, but grew up in Toronto, Ontario. He played junior and amateur ice hockey in Canada for De La Salle College, the Parkdale Canoe Club, and various senior amateur teams in the Toronto and Timmins areas before turning professional. He played in the National Hockey League (NHL) for the Hamilton Tigers, Pittsburgh Pirates, Toronto Maple Leafs and New York Americans. He went back to coach in the Ontario Hockey Association (OHA) after retiring as a player.

Spring also played professional baseball for several minor league teams between 1924 and 1928. He was player-manager of the Brockville Pirates in 1936.

Spring played for both the ice hockey Toronto Maple Leafs and the baseball Toronto Maple Leafs. In addition to playing two sports professionally, Spring played amateur lacrosse and gridiron football; he also was a boxer. Spring died in March 1942 in Toronto; he was survived by his wife and two daughters.

Career statistics

Regular season and playoffs

References

External links

1899 births
1942 deaths
Albany Senators players
Canadian baseball players
Canadian ice hockey forwards
Flint Vehicles players
Hamilton Clippers players
Hamilton Tigers (ice hockey) players
Ice hockey people from Ontario
Ice hockey players from Pennsylvania
Minor league baseball players
New York Americans players
Ottawa-Hull Senators players
Outremont Canadiens players
People from Bradford County, Pennsylvania
People from Old Toronto
Pittsburgh Pirates (NHL) players
Shamokin Indians players
Toronto Maple Leafs (International League) players
Toronto Maple Leafs players
American emigrants to Canada